Robert Carpenter may refer to:

Politicians
 Robert C. Carpenter (1924–2011), politician from North Carolina
 Robert Carpenter (American politician) (1909–1979), member of the Ohio House of Representatives
Robert Carpenter (MP) (died 1607), MP for Rye

Sports
 Robert Carpenter (cricketer) (1830–1901), English cricketer
 Rob Carpenter (running back) (born 1955), American football running back
 Rob Carpenter (wide receiver) (born 1968), American football wide receiver

Others
 R. R. M. Carpenter (Robert Ruliph Morgan Carpenter, Sr., 1877–1949), American executive and member of the board of directors of DuPont
 R. R. M. Carpenter Jr. (Robert Ruliph Morgan Carpenter, Jr., 1915–1990), his son, owner of the Philadelphia Phillies
 Ruly Carpenter (Robert Ruliph Morgan Carpenter III, born 1940), son of Robert Jr. and grandson of Robert Sr., owner and team president of the Phillies
 Robert Holt Carpenter (1820–1891), New Zealand bookbinder, politician, bookseller and character

See also
Bobby Carpenter (disambiguation)